Tinyahuarco (Hispanicized spelling of Tinya Warkhu, a Quechua term, tinya a kind of drum, warkhu hanging) is one of thirteen districts of the province Pasco Province in the Pasco Region of Peru.

See also 
 Yanaqucha

References